A. K. M. Mosharraf Hossain (1936/37 – 17 October 2020) was a Bangladesh Nationalist Party politician and a state minister of energy and mineral resources from 10 October 2001 until his resignation on 18 June 2005. He was a 2-term Jatiya Sangsad member representing the Mymensingh-5 constituency.

Career
Hossain served as a bureaucrat in the administration of President Hussain Muhammad Ershad. He was elected to the parliament from Mymensingh-5 in 1996 and 2001 as a candidate of Bangladesh Nationalist Party. He served as the state minister of energy and mineral resources in the Second Khaleda Cabinet from October 2001 to June 2005. He was removed from office on allegation of corruption regarding Niko resources.

Hossain was nominated from BNP for the Mymensingh-4 in 2008 Bangladeshi general election but he failed to win the election.

Corruption charges
Hossain received a Toyota Land Cruiser, worth 9.5 million taka, from Canadian Petroleum company Niko Resources as a bribe for a contract in the Tengratila and Feni gas fields. On 12 February 2012, Hossain was sued by the Bangladesh Anti Corruption Commission for corruption. Niko sued Bangladesh in 2010 at the International Centre for Settlement of Investment Disputes of the World Bank.

Personal life 
Hossain was married to Zeenat Mosharraf, a former Jatiya Sangsad member of Jatiya Party.

Hossain died on 17 October 2020 at a hospital in Dhaka. He was infected with the COVID-19 virus.

References

1930s births
2020 deaths
People from Mymensingh District
Bangladesh Nationalist Party politicians
State Ministers of Power, Energy and Mineral Resources
7th Jatiya Sangsad members
8th Jatiya Sangsad members
Year of birth missing
Place of birth missing
Deaths from the COVID-19 pandemic in Bangladesh